The 2021–22 Q Tour was a series of snooker tournaments that took place during the 2021–22 snooker season. The Q Tour is the second-tier tour, run by the World Professional Billiards and Snooker Association, for players not on the main World Snooker Tour. Initially announced in July 2020, the tour was delayed by a year and started in late 2021.

A series of four events were organised with the leading money-winner gaining a place on the main tour for the 2022–23 snooker season. Si Jiahui led the list but had already got a place on tour, so Sean O´Sullivan, who finished second, got the place. The 16 highest-ranked players who had not already got a place on the main tour for the 2022–23 season, gained entry to a further event, the WPBSA Q Tour Playoff, the winner of which also got a place. Julien Leclercq won this event, beating Alex Clenshaw 5–2 in the final.

Format 
Except for the playoff, events were played over three days. The first day was an open qualifying day with 16 places available. The main draw started on the second day when the 16 qualifiers were joined by the 48 seeded players who qualified based on their rankings in the 2021 Q School Order of Merit to make a first round field of 64 players. There were 3 rounds on the second day and a further three on the final day, to determine the winner of the event. The 48 who qualify directly included the top 40 ranked players not currently on the main tour and a further 8 under-21 players outside this top 40.

Prize fund 
Each event featured a prize fund of £12,000 with the winner receiving £2,500.

 Winner: £2,500
 Runner-up: £1,200
 Semi-final: £750
 Quarter-final: £550
 Last 16: £275
 Last 32: £150
 Total: £12,000

Participants 
The following 48 players were eligible to play. Players who decided not to complete were replaced by players further down the 2021 Q School Order of Merit.

Sanderson Lam
Michael Georgiou
Si Jiahui
Soheil Vahedi
Michael White
David Lilley
Ross Muir
John Astley
Bai Langning
James Cahill
Dylan Emery
Mark Lloyd
Simon Blackwell
Haydon Pinhey
Billy Castle
Kuldesh Johal
Rod Lawler
Leo Fernandez
Robbie McGuigan
Daniel Womersley
Ryan Davies
Michael Collumb
Luke Pinches
Joshua Thomond
Saqib Nasir
Niel Vincent
Sydney Wilson
Ben Fortey
Alex Millington
Ben Mertens
Tony Knowles
Oliver Brown
Brian Cini
Paul Davies
Ross Vallance
Luo Honghao
Ross Bulman
Paul Davison
Dylan Mitchell
Sean Harvey

Under-21 players:

Hayden Staniland
Jenson Kendrick
Florian Nüßle
Hamim Hussain
Liam Pullen
Julien Leclercq
Callum Beresford
Liam Graham

Top-up players:

Ian Martin
Harvey Chandler
Eden Sharav
Joshua Cooper
Lee Shanker
Alex Taubman
Brandon Sargeant
Brian Ochoiski
Lewis Gillen

Schedule 

The schedule for the four regular events and the playoff is given below.

Rankings 
Below are listed the leading players in the prize money rankings. Players on equal points were ranked by "countback", with the player having the most prize money in the later events being ranked higher. Three of the players earned places on the main tour during the season. Si Jiahui qualified by winning the World Snooker Federation Open, while David Lilley and Michael White qualified via the 2021-22 season one year ranking list.

Event 1 
The first event took place at Castle Snooker Club, Brighton, from 19 to 21 November 2021. David Lilley beat Si Jiahui 5–1 in the final. The final-day results are given below.

Event 2 
The second event was held at the Terry Griffiths Matchroom in Llanelli from 10 to 12 December. Si Jiahui beat Michael White 5–4 in the final. Si led 4–0 before White won the next four frames to take the match to a decider. The final-day results are given below.

Event 3 
The third event was held at The Winchester in Leicester from 28 to 30 January. Nutcharut Wongharuthai, Thailand’s leading female player, won five matches to reach the final-day quarter-finals. Sean O'Sullivan won the event, beating Julien Leclercq 5–2 in the final. The final-day results are given below.

Event 4 
The fourth event was held at the Northern Snooker Centre in Leeds from 18 to 20 March. At the start of the final day only Simon Bedford could take the automatic qualification place held by Sean O'Sullivan. However Bedford lost to Robbie McGuigan in the semi-finals, guaranteeing  that O'Sullivan would take the automatic qualification place. McGuigan went on to win the event, beating Michael Collumb 5–3 in the final. The final-day results are given below.

Playoff 
The final event, the WPBSA Q Tour Playoff, was held at the Q House Snooker Academy in Darlington on 10 and 11 May. The event saw the 16 highest ranked players, excluding the four already qualified for the main tour, compete for a further place on that tour. Two rounds were played each day with matches over 7 frames except for the final which was over 9 frames. The draw was seeded, based on the final rankings. Julien Leclercq won the event, beating Alex Clenshaw 5–2 in the final. Leclercq scored three centuries in his opening match against Alfie Lee, and reached the final with further wins against Michael Georgiou and Harvey Chandler. Clenshaw had won his semi-final against Liam Davies despite losing the first three frames. Clenshaw won the first two frames in the final but Leclercq won the next five, to win a place on the main tour.

References 

Q Tour
Q Tour
Q Tour